Pixar Short Films Collection, Volume 1 is a home video compilation released by Walt Disney Home Entertainment on November 9, 2007, containing 13 of Pixar's short films. It was followed by Pixar Short Films Collection, Volume 2, which was released on November 9, 2012, and Pixar Short Films Collection, Volume 3, which was released on November 9, 2018.

Background and development 
Commenting on Pixar Short Films Collection, Volume 1, John Lasseter said:
I am really excited about finally coming out with a collection of the Pixar short films because these have been so much a part of the history of Pixar. The early short films before Toy Story came out really shows the evolution and the focus of kind of the history of Pixar and the development of the technology, the development of me as a filmmaker and a storyteller, and then our continued dedication to creating short films after Toy Story and the coming out of, trying out of new talent and continuing the R&D research and stuff. And, for me, I love the short film because there are certain ideas that are perfect for short film that are not necessarily meant for a feature film. And it’s still worth doing. 
Lasseter hoped that audiences will get a "kick out" of each of the shorts included in the collection, stating: "I hope that they look at them and just are surprised by how funny they are. All I think except one are basically no dialogue. It’s like Chuck Jones said, ‘With great animation, you should be able to turn the sound off and still tell what’s going on.’ And I think they're these wonderful little gems and they're really entertaining. It shows also the ability of our filmmakers to be able to, in a short amount of time – one and half minutes to five minutes and without dialogue – still establish really memorable characters."

The version of Knick Knack included with this release was the censored version which was first released in 2003 with the cinema release of Finding Nemo. The censored version removes the exaggerated breasts on the woman on the "Miami" knick knack and on the mermaid sitting on the rock in the fish bowl. John Lasseter defended these changes by saying "It wasn't big bad Disney coming in and insisting we do this... it was our own choice. It was just crossing the line for me personally as a father. So I made the decision to reduce [these characters'] breast size."

Critical response 
Pixar Short Films Collection, Volume 1 received acclaim from contemporary critics. The film review aggregation website Rotten Tomatoes reports that 100% of critics have given the compilation a positive review based on 5 reviews, with an average score of 8.6/10.

Kevin Carr of 7M Pictures wrote that "with how affordable DVDs are to rent", there are few that he would recommend as a "must-buy", citing Pixar Short Films Collection, Volume 1 as an exception, "considering the wealth of entertainment and historical value" it contains. Carr explained that while he loved the Pixar theatrical films immensely, "one of the extra bonuses of seeing them is the short films they always tag on the beginning". He revealed that he enjoyed watching the short films "almost as much" as the films itself and that the short films attached to later DVD releases were "equally as fun to watch". Carr expressed his hopes for Pixar to be around for "many years to come" and continue to provide "some of the best animated entertainment ever seen". He concluded his review by stating that it is "going to be too long to wait for the Pixar Short Film Collection: Volume II, but I guess we'll just have to be patient."

Writing for Movie Metropolis, John J. Puccio declared that while those who have previously collected Pixar's full-length feature films on home video will already own some of the shorts featured on Pixar Short Films Collection, Volume 1, it's "nice to have all of them collected together in one spot". He wrote that "they're worth having, if for no other reasons than because they chronicle the history of the studio so well and because the Pixar filmmakers execute some of them as brilliantly as they do any of their main attractions". According to Puccio, there is no doubt that the later Pixar shorts are "among the finest cartoons ever made". He wrote that while the earlier ones are also "interesting and certainly innovative", they don't "bear repeat viewing as much". Puccio declared that if there were any negatives about the collection, it would be its length, but stated that "it makes one wonder what Volume 2 will bring our way in a few more years". Writing for The A.V. Club, Tasha Robinson declared Pixar Short Films Collection, Volume 1 to display the "stunning progress" that Pixar has made in turning computer animation into a "rich artistic medium". Robinson cited the collection as "an informative, touching 23-minute pocket history of Pixar."

Shorts

Bonus shorts
Included as a supplement are 4 shorts made for Sesame Street, "Surprise", "Light and Heavy", "Up and Down", and "Front and Back" in 1991.

Release history

References

External links 
 Official website
 

Short film compilations
Disney home video releases
Pixar short films
2000s American films